Jason Tsai (born Tsai Ji-chun ; May 17, 1951 at Tainan County, Taiwan, is a Taiwanese founder and chairman of the Entagroup of telecommunications companies in the United Kingdom (UK); including Entatech UK Ltd, Entamedia Ltd, and Enta.net.  He is also the founder of UK Telford Chinese School, and the president of The Tsai Lao-Chi Charitable Foundation in the UK.

His British-registered company Changtel was found by Her Majesty's Revenue and Customs (HMRC) to have participated in carousel fraud, as a result of which Tsai lost control of Entatech.  On 8 May 2017, as the final link to that fraud, Entatech entered administration, and 50 people lost their jobs overnight.  On 21 July 2017, Tsai was sentenced to imprisonment for 18 months at the High Court of Justice (Chancery Division) for Contempt of Court on account of 27 breaches of a Freezing Order.

Charity and sponsorship
Tsai Lau-Chi Charitable Foundation (Reg. charity number 1069997)
UK Telford Chinese School, promoting Chinese culture to the West
Tsai's Gallery in Enta HQ; collections from Taiwanese oil painting, sculpture, ceramic art, and publications, etc.

Awards and achievements
Director of the Anglo-Chinese Economic and Trade Association
Youth Model Awards of Overseas Taiwanese Entrepreneur (1995)
Chairman of the Taiwanese Chamber of Commerce in the United Kingdom (1998)
Chairman of the Taiwanese Chamber of Commerce in Europe (1999)
Councillor of the Overseas Chinese Affairs Committee (2000–2006) 
Entrepreneur of the Year, Comms Business Awards (2010)

References

External links
Entagroup.com
UK Telford Chinese School
ChineseOverseas.org

1951 births
Living people
20th-century Taiwanese businesspeople
21st-century Taiwanese businesspeople
Businesspeople from Tainan